Gold Mine may refer to:

Gold Mine (board game)
Gold Mine (Long Beach), an arena
"Gold Mine", a song by Joyner Lucas from the 2020 album ADHD

See also
Gold (1974 film), based on the novel Gold Mine by Wilbur Smith
Gold mining
Goldmine (disambiguation)